Sterling High School is a high school, located at 1608 Fourth Ave in Sterling, Illinois.It is one of the district's public schools.

School Administration 

 Dr. Tad Everett, Superintendent 
 Dr. Sara Dail, Assistant Superintendent
 Mr. Tim Schwingle, Director of Finance
 Mrs. Becky Haas, Director of Student Services
 Mr. Matt Birdsley, Director of Curriculum and Instruction
 Mr. Tyler Jakse, Director of Athletics and Activities 
 Mr. Tim Schlegel, Director of Theatre
 Mr. Jason Austin, Principal
 Mrs. Amy Downs, Associate Principal
 Mrs. Alexandria Miller, Dean of Students 
 Mr. Jeffery Gale, Counselor and Freshman Class Supervisor
 Mrs. Kaileen Gaumer, Counselor and Senior Class Supervisor
 Mrs. Darci Francis, Counselor and Junior Class Supervisor
 Ms. Christine Herron, Counselor and Sophomore Class Supervisor

Notable alumni
 Lew Andreas
 Terry Brooks
 Keith L. Brown
 Leo J Wahl, founder of Wahl Clipper
 Paul Zaeske, American football player
 Malcolm Slaney, American electrical engineer and research scientist at Google

References

External links
 Sterling High School website

Public high schools in Illinois
Schools in Whiteside County, Illinois